Sportvereniging Alverna Wijchen Combinatie is a football club from Wijchen, Netherlands. SV AWC plays in the 2018–19 Sunday Hoofdklasse.

History
SV AWC was founded on 28 April 1932.

Twice they competed in  the KNVB Cup, but never made it past the first round. The first time in the 1956–57 KNVB Cup, a 6–2 loss against Vitesse, and most recent in the 1983–84 KNVB Cup, a 1–0 loss against Quick Boys.

References

External links
 Official site

Football clubs in the Netherlands
Association football clubs established in 1932
1932 establishments in the Netherlands
Football clubs in Wijchen